Prionapteryx moghrebana is a moth in the family Crambidae. It was described by Daniel Lucas in 1954. It is found in Morocco.

References

Ancylolomiini
Moths described in 1954